Majd Arbasha (born April 21, 1990) is a Syrian professional basketball player.  He currently plays for Al Wahda Damascus of the Syrian Basketball League.

He has been a member of Syria's national basketball team. At the 2017 WABA Championship in Amman, Jordan, he recorded most minutes and steals for Syria.

References

External links
 2017 WABA Championship profile
 Asia-basket.com profile
 REAL GM profile

1990 births
Living people
Shooting guards
Sportspeople from Damascus
Syrian men's basketball players
Al Wahda men's basketball players